Paul Hutchens (April 7, 1902, Thorntown, Indiana – January 23, 1977, Colorado Springs, Colorado) was an American author.  In addition to writing The Sugar Creek Gang, a series of 36 Christian-themed juvenile fiction books about the adventures of a group of young boys, he also wrote numerous adult fiction books, many with a romance theme.
 The author was a graduate of Moody Bible Institute. The Sugar Creek Gang books have been popular in evangelical Christian homes and have remained in print through multiple format and cover art changes. The books have also been dramatized on the radio, and in 2004, the stories were made into a series of movies, directed by Joy Chapman and Owen Smith.  His books were originally published by Wm. B. Eerdmans, and later reprinted by other publishers such as Van Kampen Press and Moody Press.

Bibliography
Romance of Fire (1934)
This Way Out
A Song Forever (1936)
The Last First (1936)
The Voice (1937)
This Is Life 
Mastering Marcus (1938)
Yesterday's Rain (1938)
Shafted Sunlight
Windblown (1942)
Blaze Start
The Vision (1942)
Cup of Cold Water
Eclipse
When God Says No
Morning Flight (1944)
A Song Forever (1945)
How to Meet Your Troubles
Uninterrupted Sky (1949)
Morning Light (1952)
Cup of Cold Water (1952)
The Mystery of the Marsh (1956)
Yours for Four Years (1954)
East of the Shadow
My Life and I (autobiography) (1962)

The Sugar Creek Gang series

Battle of the Bees
Blue Cow
Brown Box Mystery
Bull Fighter
Cemetery Vandals
Chicago Adventure
Colorado Kidnapping
Ghost Dog
Green Tent Mystery
Haunted House
Indian Cemetery
Killer Bear
Killer Cat
Locked in the Attic
Lost Camper
Lost in the Blizzard
Mystery Cave
Mystery Thief
On the Mexican Border
One Stormy Day
Palm Tree Manhunt
Runaway Rescue
Screams in the Night
Secret Hideout
Swamp Robber
Teacher Trouble
Thousand Dollar Fish
Timber Wolf
Trapline Thief
Treasure Hunt
Tree House Mystery
Watermelon Mystery
Western Adventure
White Boat Rescue
Winter Rescue

Jeanie series

It All Began With Jeanie
The Trouble With Jeanie
Terror On The Mountain

References

External links
 
 
 

People from Thorntown, Indiana
Writers from Colorado Springs, Colorado
Writers from Indiana
1902 births
1977 deaths